Quriyeh (also Romanized as Qūrīyeh and Qowryeh; also known as Qoryeh) is a village in Ijrud-e Pain Rural District, Halab District, Ijrud County, Zanjan Province, Iran. At the 2006 census, its population was 124, in 40 families.

References 

Populated places in Ijrud County